Godley East was a railway station in the Godley area of Hyde, Tameside, Greater Manchester, on the Woodhead Line.

Early history

On 17 November 1841, Godley was the temporary terminus of the Sheffield, Ashton-under-Lyne and Manchester Railway's (SAuLMR) line from Manchester Store Street. The station was located close to the Hyde and Mottram Road and was sometimes referred to as "Godley Toll Bar".

The station, which was named as "Godley Junction", had four platform faces: two on the Manchester line and two on the CLC route. The CLC platforms were only ever lightly used. The station and sidings were controlled by a single mechanical signal box which was located at the east end of the 'up' (Hadfield) platform.

The connection to Woodley gave the MS&LR access to the Port of Liverpool without the need go via Manchester. This resulted in Godley becoming the point where freight traffic from as far away as Merseyside met with traffic going to and fro over the Pennines. Exchange sidings were laid on both the MS&LR and the CLC sides of the station; those on the CLC side were known as Brookfold Sidings. Brookfold Sidings had their own turntable and signal box. A CLC traffic office was based at Godley and, during the Second World War, the London and North Eastern Railway had an operational headquarters at the rear of the Up main line platform which controlled operations as far east as Wath and Doncaster.

Electrification
The electrification of the Woodhead line in 1954 gave Godley a strategic importance as it was the point where steam and then diesel workings over the former CLC system met with electric services via Woodhead. A traction change-over siding was installed and loops on each side of the line ran from Godley Junction to a point  to the east. These loops were controlled by their own signal box known as "Godley East".

On 1 April 1969, the turntable was taken out of use. The station was renamed from Godley Junction to Godley on 6 May 1974.

By the late 1970s, traffic had declined on the Woodhead line and the sidings at Godley had become overgrown. On 20 July 1981, the connection to Woodley closed along with the Woodhead line between Hadfield and Penistone. Track lifting followed in 1985–6.

Closure
On 7 July 1986, a new station called  was opened on the site of the original Godley Toll Bar station, and the original station was renamed Godley East. Thereafter, a Parliamentary train ran to Godley East - a Saturdays only 12:38  to  train. The station formally closed on 27 May 1995.

Present day
The main platforms remained intact in 2015, although largely overgrown. The platforms on the Hadfield line are fenced off; however from the cycle track which now runs along the former line to Woodley and Stockport, the remains of the other platforms are visible. The derelict footbridge was removed during the late 2000s.

The turntable pit is still in existence and remains in remarkably good condition and free of debris.

References

Disused railway stations in Tameside
Former Great Central Railway stations
Former Cheshire Lines Committee stations
Railway stations in Great Britain opened in 1841
Railway stations in Great Britain closed in 1842
Railway stations in Great Britain opened in 1866
Railway stations in Great Britain closed in 1995